Juan José Estrada (November 28, 1963 – June 21, 2015) was a Mexican professional boxer in the Super Bantamweight division. He was a onetime WBC International and the WBA Super Bantamweight Champion.

Professional career
In December 1987, Estrada won the WBC International title by stopping veteran Raul Payo Valdez in the tenth round.

WBA Super Bantamweight Championship
On May 28, 1988, Estrada won the WBA Super Bantamweight title by upsetting Bernardo Piñango over twelve rounds in Tijuana, Baja California, Mexico.

Death
Estrada was stabbed to death on June 21, 2015 in what is believed to be a family dispute. He was 51.

See also
List of Mexican boxing world champions
List of WBA world champions
List of bantamweight boxing champions

References

External links

1963 births
2015 deaths
Boxers from Baja California
Sportspeople from Tijuana
World boxing champions
World Boxing Association champions
World super-bantamweight boxing champions
Super-bantamweight boxers
Mexican male boxers
People murdered in Mexico
Deaths by stabbing in Mexico
Male murder victims
Mexican murder victims